Éric Vandenabeele (born 16 December, 1991) is a French professional footballer who plays for  club Rodez AF as a centre-back.

Career
A native of Calais, Vandenabeele began his footballing career in the youth system at his hometown team Calais RUFC in 1997. He spent nine years with the club before transferring to Boulogne in 2006. He made his senior debut on 7 August, 2012 in the defeat to Chamois Niortais in the first round of the Coupe de la Ligue, and went on to play more than 70 matches for the club over the next four seasons.

Vandenabeele joined Grenoble Foot 38 in the summer of 2016.

On 30 August, 2022, Vandenabeele signed a three-year contract with Rodez.

Career statistics

References

External links
 
 

1991 births
Sportspeople from Calais
Footballers from Hauts-de-France
Living people
French footballers
Association football defenders
US Boulogne players
Grenoble Foot 38 players
Valenciennes FC players
Rodez AF players
Ligue 2 players
Championnat National players
Championnat National 2 players
Championnat National 3 players